The Office Depot was a golf tournament on the LPGA Tour from 1997 to 2001. It was played at Ibis Golf & Country Club in West Palm Beach, Florida from 1997 to 2000 and at the Doral Golf Resort & Spa in Miami, Florida in 2001.

Winners
The Office Depot
2001 Grace Park
2000 Karrie Webb
1999 Karrie Webb
1998 Helen Alfredsson

Diet Dr Pepper National Pro-Am
1997 Kelly Robbins

See also
Office Depot Championship, another LPGA event

References

Former LPGA Tour events
Golf in Florida
Recurring sporting events established in 1997
Recurring sporting events disestablished in 2001
1997 establishments in Florida
2001 disestablishments in Florida
Women's sports in Florida